Hato Mayor (greater cattle-raising district) is a province of the Dominican Republic.  The province was split from El Seibo in 1984.

Municipalities and municipal districts

The province as of June 20, 2006 is divided into the following  municipalities (municipios) and municipal districts (distrito municipal - D.M.) within them:
El Valle
Hato Mayor del Rey
Guayabo Dulce (D.M.)
Mata Palacio (D.M.)
Yerba Buena (D.M.)
Sabana de la Mar
Elupina Cordero de las Cañitas (D.M.)

The following is a sortable table of the municipalities and municipal districts with population figures as of the 2014 estimate. Urban population are those living in the seats (cabeceras literally heads) of municipalities or of municipal districts. Rural population are those living in the districts (Secciones literally sections) and neighborhoods (Parajes literally places) outside them. The population figures are from the 2014 population estimate.

For comparison with the municipalities and municipal districts of other provinces see the list of municipalities and municipal districts of the Dominican Republic.

References

External links

  Oficina Nacional de Estadística, Statistics Portal of the Dominican Republic
  Oficina Nacional de Estadística, Maps with administrative division of the provinces of the Dominican Republic, downloadable in PDF format

 
Provinces of the Dominican Republic
States and territories established in 1984